Benzocycloheptenes are cycloheptenes with additional benzene rings attached. Most have two benzene rings, and are called dibenzocycloheptenes.

Some benzocycloheptenes and substituted benzocycloheptenes have medical uses as antihistamines, anticholinergics, antidepressants, and antiserotonergics.

Examples include:
 Antihistamines and Antiserotonergics
 Azatadine
 Desloratadine
 Loratadine
 Rupatadine
 Cyproheptadine
 Ketotifen
 Pizotifen
 Anticholinergics
 Deptropine
 Anticonvulsants
 Oxitriptyline
 Antidepressants and Anticholinergics
 Amineptine
 Amitriptyline
 Nortriptyline
 Noxiptyline
 Octriptyline
 Protriptyline
 Various
 Cyclobenzaprine
 Intriptyline

See also 

 Toll-like receptor 4 investigating probable antagonistic (antiinflammatory) property of several TCA based molecules

External links
 

Dibenzocycloheptenes